Kauko Ilmari Tuupainen (born 8 May 1940 in Kalajoki) is a Finnish accountant and politician. He was a member of the Parliament of Finland between 2011 and 2015, representing the Finns Party.

References

1940 births
Living people
People from Kalajoki
Finnish Lutherans
Finns Party politicians
Members of the Parliament of Finland (2011–15)
Accountants